Mary Killman (born April 9, 1991) is an American synchronized swimmer. After switching to synchronized swimming from race swimming, Killman was a member of the teams that won silver medals in the duet and team competitions at the 2011 Pan American Games in Guadalajara, Mexico and 2015 Pan American Games in Toronto, Ontario, Canada.

Biography
Killman was born on April 9, 1991 in Ada, Oklahoma, and grew up in Texas. She is an enrolled member of the Citizen Potawatomi Nation, a federally recognized tribe based in Oklahoma. Originally a competitor in racing events, Killman began to participate in synchronized swimming competitions at the age of 11, and at age 15 gave up racing to focus exclusively on synchronized swimming.

After competing in youth competitions through the 2000s, in 2007 Killman was named to her first National Team at the mere age of 16. In 2009 Killman found success at the United States National Championships, finishing third in the solo competition, second in the duet competition, and first in the team competition. Shortly before the 2011 Pan American Games in Guadalajara, Mexico, she was partnered with Mariya Koroleva to compete as a duet. At those games, Killman and Koroleva won a silver medal in the duet competition, and were part of the United States team that won a silver in the team competition as well. The pair qualified for the women's duet at the 2012 Summer Olympics in London, and due to the failure of the United States to qualify for the team event, they were the only American women to compete in synchronized swimming at those games.

Following the 2012 Olympics, Killman joined the Lindenwood University synchronized swimming team, one of six collegiate varsity synchronized programs in the United States and is currently a four times USA synchro athlete of the year (2010, 2011, 2012, 2014); she holds five US senior national solo titles (2010, 2013, 2014, 2015, 2016) and three US collegiate national solo titles (2013, 2014, 2015) with the 4th consecutive title not claimed due to not competing at the collegiate level for her senior year.

References

1991 births
Living people
American synchronized swimmers
Synchronized swimmers at the 2011 Pan American Games
Potawatomi people
Native American sportspeople
Synchronized swimmers at the 2012 Summer Olympics
Olympic synchronized swimmers of the United States
People from Ada, Oklahoma
Lindenwood University alumni
Synchronized swimmers at the 2015 Pan American Games
Synchronized swimmers at the 2015 World Aquatics Championships
Pan American Games silver medalists for the United States
Pan American Games bronze medalists for the United States
Pan American Games medalists in synchronized swimming
Medalists at the 2011 Pan American Games
Medalists at the 2015 Pan American Games
21st-century Native American women
21st-century Native Americans
Sportspeople from Oklahoma